The Plaxton Profile is a coach built by Plaxton for the Volvo B7R and Dennis Javelin chassis. It is the smallest of Plaxton's full-sized coach range.

It began life as the Premiere 320 which was then updated to the Prima when the Premiere was replaced by the Paragon. The Prima was then modified with the Paragon lower dash panel and rear panel and rechristened the Profile.

It was the first Plaxton coach to meet DDA requirements by widening the entrance in order to fit a wheelchair lift. It has seen success with smaller independents but a large batch has gone to Stagecoach primarily for their Bluebird routes. Some have also gone to First.

The Profile was not modified to meet the European Commission Whole Vehicle Type Approval, it ceased production in 2012.  Its replacement, the Plaxton Leopard, was launched in 2013.

References

External links

Profile
Vehicles introduced in 2002